The 1970 New Mexico Lobos football team represented the University of New Mexico in the Western Athletic Conference (WAC) during the 1970 NCAA University Division football season.  In their third season under head coach Rudy Feldman, the Lobos compiled a 7–3 record (5–1 against WAC opponents), finished second in the WAC, and outscored opponents, 291 to 222.

The team's statistical leaders included Rocky Long with 649 passing yards, Sam Scarber with 961 rushing yards and 78 points scored, and Tom McBee with 125 receiving yards.

Schedule

References

New Mexico
New Mexico Lobos football seasons
New Mexico Lobos